The first season of the reality television series Love & Hip Hop: Hollywood aired on VH1 from September 15, 2014 until December 9, 2014. It was primarily filmed in Los Angeles, California. It is executively produced by Mona Scott-Young for Monami Entertainment, Toby Barraud and Stefan Springman for Eastern TV, and Susan Levison, Nina L. Diaz and Vivian Gomez for VH1.

The series chronicles the lives of several women and men in the Hollywood area, involved in hip hop music. It consists of 14 episodes, including a two-part reunion special hosted by Mona Scott-Young.

Production
On August 18, 2014, VH1 announced Love & Hip Hop: Hollywood, the Los Angeles-based spin-off of Love & Hip Hop, would make its series premiere on September 15, 2014. On September 8, 2014, a 4 minute "super-trailer" was released, along with Meet the Cast of Love & Hip Hop: Hollywood, an 11-minute promo video featuring interviews with the cast. The series would star Ray J, Soulja Boy, Omarion and his girlfriend Apryl Jones, Lil' Fizz and his ex-girlfriend Moniece Slaughter, Teairra Marí and former celebrity publicist Hazel-E, with Ray's assistant Morgan Hardman, Teddy Riley's daughter Nia Riley, Fizz's girlfriend Amanda Secor, Yung Berg, radio personality Yesi Ortiz, club promoter Sincere Show, socialite Nikki Mudarris and video vixen Masika Kaylsha as supporting cast members. Although not mentioned in the initial cast announcement, Omarion's mother Leslie Burrell would also appear as a supporting cast member.

On November 5, 2014, Yung Berg was arrested for allegedly assaulting his girlfriend and fellow cast member Masika, several hours after the taping of the reunion special. VH1 released a statement that he had been terminated from the show effective immediately. On December 8, 2014, series creator Mona Scott-Young expressed regret for the firing, saying it was a network decision. The two-part reunion aired with a public service announcement about domestic violence, along with a statement by VH1 condemning Berg's actions.

Synopsis

Cast

Starring

 Teairra Marí (14 episodes)
 Moniece Slaughter (10 episodes)
 Apryl Jones (12 episodes)
 Hazel-E (13 episodes)
 Ray J (13 episodes)
 Lil' Fizz (12 episodes)
 Omarion (12 episodes)
 Soulja Boy (11 episodes)

Also starring

 Morgan Hardman (10 episodes)
 Nia Riley (11 episodes)
 Leslie Burrell (8 episodes)
 Amanda Secor (9 episodes)
 Nikki Mudarris (11 episodes)
 Yung Berg (10 episodes)
 Masika Kalysha (13 episodes)
 Yesi Ortiz (6 episodes)
 Sincere Show (9 episodes)

Princess Love, producer Mally Mall and Nikki's mother Michelle Mudarris appear as guest stars in several episodes. The show also features minor appearances from notable figures within the hip hop industry and Hollywood's social scene, including Miss Diddy, Teddy Riley, Ray's manager Cash "Wack 100" Jones, Willie Norwood, Sonja Norwood, Brandy Norwood, Moniece's cousin Stevie Mackey, Snoop Dogg and Rick Ross.

Episodes

Music
Several cast members had their music featured on the show and released singles to coincide with the airing of the episodes.

References

External links

2014 American television seasons
Love & Hip Hop